The 1908 William & Mary Orange and White football team represented the College of William & Mary as a member of the Eastern Virginia Intercollegiate Athletic Association (EVIAA) during the 1909 college football season. Le by first-year head coach George E. O'Hearn, the Orange and White compiled an overall record of 4–6–1.

Schedule

References

William and Mary
William & Mary Tribe football seasons
William and Mary Orange and White football